The genus Lindernia is a group of plants in the family Linderniaceae. They are native to warm regions in both the Eastern and Western Hemisphere.

The genus name of Lindernia is in honour of Franz Balthasar von Lindern (1682–1755), French doctor and botanist in Strasbourg and also university botanical garden director. 

Lindernia consists of 30 species in its most recent circumscription.

Species list

Lindernia alsinoides
Lindernia alterniflora
Lindernia benthamii
Lindernia brachyphylla
Lindernia bryoides
Lindernia capensis
Lindernia crustacea
Lindernia conferta
Lindernia congesta
Lindernia dubia
Lindernia grandiflora
Lindernia hyssopioides
Lindernia jiuhuanica
Lindernia lemuriana
Lindernia linearifolia
Lindernia madagascariensis
Lindernia madayiparensis
Lindernia manilaliana
Lindernia microcalyx
Lindernia minima
Lindernia monroi
Lindernia monticola
Lindernia natans
Lindernia paludosa
Lindernia parviflora
Lindernia procumbens
Lindernia rotundata
Lindernia rotundifolia
Lindernia srilankana
Lindernia tridentata
Lindernia viguieri

References

Linderniaceae
Lamiales genera
Taxa named by Carlo Allioni